Jorgjia Filçe-Truja (20 January 1907 – 22 June 1994) was an Albanian soprano. She was one of the icons of the Albanian urban lyrical music, and one of the main contributors for the establishment of the Academy of Arts of Albania.

Life 
She was born in Korçë, today's eastern Albania, back then still part of the Ottoman Empire on 20 January 1907. She studied in the Santa Сеcilia Conservatory in Rome during 1927–1932. She gave many concerts during the 1930s to the 1950s, becoming an icon of the urban lyrical music in Albania. Together with Tefta Tashko-Koço and Marie Kraja, she represented the avant-garde of the lyrical music in the country.

Truja was one of the first pedagogues of the Queen Mother Pedagogical Institute for girls in Tirana. After World War II, she became one of the initiators for bringing the artistic life of Albanian into an academic path by establishing the first higher art institutions, such as Jordan Misja Lyceum in 1946, Academy of Arts of Albania, where she lectured canto and conducting. She interpreted in many operas and brought to the stage many works as a director. She died in Tirana in 1994, leaving behind an autobiographical work.

Notes and references 
Notes

References

Sources

Further reading 

Ëndrra dhe realitete: monografi kushtuar artistes shqiptare Jorgjie Truja (Filçe), Hamide Stringa; ed. Loredan Bubani, Tirana: Toena, 2006. .
Muza e parë: rrëfim autobiografik, Vasil S. Tole; Takuina Truja Adami, Tirana: Albas, 2014, .

1907 births
1994 deaths
20th-century Albanian women opera singers
People from Korçë
People from Manastir vilayet
Academic staff of the University of Arts, Tirana
Queen Mother Pedagogical Institute faculty
Accademia Nazionale di Santa Cecilia alumni